Farm to Market Roads in Texas are owned and maintained by the Texas Department of Transportation (TxDOT).

FM 2000

Farm to Market Road 2000 (FM 2000) is located in Burleson County.

FM 2000 begins at an intersection with SH 21 just outside of Caldwell. The highway runs in a mostly northern direction before turning into FM 1362 at an intersection with County Road 336.

The highway was extended further north to the community of Hix on May 6, 1964. FM 2000 was extended to its current northern terminus at FM 1362 on September 5, 1973.

FM 2001

Farm to Market Road 2001 (FM 2001) is located in Hays and Caldwell counties.

FM 2001 begins at an intersection with US 183 in Lockhart. The highway runs in a western direction along Silent Valley Road and leaves the town after the SH 130 junction. The highway runs through rural farm land before entering the town of Niederwald, where it has an overlap with SH 21. After FM 2001 leaves the overlap with SH 21 it crosses into Hays County and passes by rural subdivisions. The highway makes a few near 90 degree turns before entering Buda, where the road ends at I-35.

FM 2001 was designated on December 17, 1952, running from US 81 (now I-35) to SH 21. The highway was extended south past SH 21 to SH 142 near Lockhart on November 21, 1956. FM 2001's southern terminus was relocated to US 183 on February 28, 1957.

Junction list

FM 2002

Farm to Market Road 2002 (FM 2002) is located in Martin County.

FM 2002 begins at an intersection with FM 829 in a rural area of the county. The highway runs in a slight northeast direction and runs in a slightly southeast direction on the overlap with SH 137. After leaving the overlap, FM 2002 runs in a slight northeast direction, turns southeast at County Roads 3901 / 4700, and turns back northeast at County Road 4600. The highway has an intersection with FM 26 roughly halfway between SH 137 south and Ackerly. FM 2002 runs along the southern border of Ackerly, where it is known locally as Avenue H. The highway ends at an intersection with US 87 just east of the town.

FM 2002 was designated on December 17, 1952, running from FM 1742 east of Flower Grove to Loop near Ackerly. On January 29, 1953, the road was extended west to SH 137 in Flower Grove and east to US 87, replacing segments of FM 1742 (the remainder became FM 26 on April 9, 1953) and Loop 67 (the remainder became part of FM 2212 on April 1, 1954). FM 2002 was extended westward to FM 1718 (now FM 829) on September 29, 1954, bringing the highway to its current route.

Junction list

FM 2003

Farm to Market Road 2003 (FM 2003) is located in Foard County.

FM 2003 begins at an intersection with County Roads 365 / 370. The highway mostly runs in an eastern direction and ends at an intersection with SH 6 (formerly SH 283) south of Crowell.

FM 2003 was designated on December 17, 1952, along the current route.

FM 2004

Farm to Market Road 2004 (FM 2004) is located in Brazoria and Galveston counties. It runs from SH 36 near Jones Creek to SH 3 in Texas City.

FM 2005

Farm to Market Road 2005 (FM 2005) is located in Mills and Hamilton counties.

FM 2005 begins at an intersection with US 84 near the town of Goldthwaite. The highway travels in a northeast direction and has an overlap with FM 221 near Shive. FM 2005 turns in a more northern direction after the overlap before ending at an intersection with FM 218 near Hamilton.

The highway was extended  northeastward to FM 218 on October 28, 1953. FM 2005 was extended  to FM 575 on September 2, 1955, absorbing FM 2248 in the process. The highway was extended to US 84 on April 25, 1959, absorbing part of FM 575 in the process.

Junction list

FM 2006

Farm to Market Road 2006 (FM 2006) is located in Hardeman County.

FM 2006 begins at an intersection with US 287 between Quanah and Chillicothe. The highway travels in a northern direction through highly rural areas of the county and turns east at Lewis Road before turning south at Honeycutt Road. FM 2006 runs in a southern direction and passes by ranch land and turns southeast at Taylor Road and enters Chillicothe, where the highway ends at an intersection with FM 91. The section of FM 2006 between Lewis Road and Honeycutt Road runs within  of the Red River.

On September 20, 1961, a farm to market road from the end of FM 2006 to the end of FM 2007 was designated.

FM 2007

Farm to Market Road 2007 (FM 2007) is located in southeastern Reeves County.

FM 2007 was designated on May 2, 1962, along the current route.

FM 2007 (1952)

On August 24, 1954, the route was extended north . FM 2007 was cancelled on October 9, 1961, and transferred to FM 2006.

FM 2008

Farm to Market Road 2008 (FM 2008) is located in Garza County in the South Plains region.

FM 2008 begins at an intersection with US 380 east of Post. The highway travels in a northern direction through rural ranch land with several oil wells before ending at an intersection with FM 651 southwest of Kalgary.

The highway was extended  to FM 651 on October 26, 1983.

FM 2008 (1952)

On October 28, 1953, the road was extended north . FM 2009 was cancelled on November 23, 1954, and transferred to FM 379 (now SH 163).

FM 2009

Farm to Market Road 2009 (FM 2009) is located in Motley County. The highway connects SH 70 north of Matador to FM 97 near Flomot.

FM 2009 was designated on December 17, 1952, along the current route.

FM 2010

Farm to Market Road 2010 (FM 2010) is located in Henderson and Van Zandt counties.

FM 2010 begins at an intersection with FM 315 (Broad Street) in Chandler, just north of SH 31. The highway travels in a predominately northern direction before ending at an intersection with FM 279, just east of Edom.

The current FM 2010 was designated on January 30, 1963, running from SH 31 northwestward to FM 279. The highway's southern terminus was relocated to FM 315 on January 15, 1964.

FM 2010 (1952)

The first use of the FM 2010 designation was in Runnels County, from US 83 in Winters east and south  to FM 53 at Crews. FM 2010 was cancelled on October 28, 1953, and transferred to FM 382 and FM 1770.

FM 2010 (1953)

FM 2010 was designated a second time on October 28, 1953, in Coryell County from FM 932 near Purmela northwest  to the Hamilton County line. FM 2010 was cancelled on October 18, 1954, and became a portion of FM 1241 when it was extended.

FM 2010 (1955)

The third time the FM 2010 designation was in Hockley County, from SH 51 (now US 385), 6.3 miles south of Levelland, east  to FM 1632 (now FM 168). On November 21, 1956, the road was extended west  to FM 300  (now FM 303) 3.5 miles south of Sundown. On October 31, 1957, the road was extended east  to US 62. FM 2010 was cancelled on November 21, 1957, and transferred to FM 1585.

FM 2010 (1958)

FM 2010 was designated for a fourth time on October 31, 1958, in Yoakum County from US 380 at Bronco to FM 1077 (now US 82). On May 25, 1962, FM 2010 was cancelled and transferred to FM 769.

FM 2011

Farm to Market Road 2011 (FM 2011) runs from FM 1716 near Lake Cherokee northwest to FM 2087 near Kilgore.

FM 2011 was designated on December 17, 1952, from SH 322 southward to FM 782. On October 26, 1954, FM 2011 was extended north to FM 2087. On June 30, 1955, the section of FM 2011 from SH 322 south of the Gregg/Rusk County Line to FM 782 (along with FM 2013 from FM 2011 to Chalk Hill) was cancelled in exchange for the creation of the new FM 1716, which connected FM 782 to Chalk Hill. On February 23, 1960, FM 2011 was extended to FM 1716, replacing FM 2606.

Junction list

FM 2012

Farm to Market Road 2012 (FM 2012) runs from FM 850 near New London north to SH 31 near Kilgore.

FM 2012 was designated on December 17, 1952, from SH 259(now SH 42/135) in Laird Hill to SH 135 (now FM 918). On May 2, 1962, FM 2012 was extended south to FM 850. On July 11, 1968, FM 2012 was extended north to SH 31.

FM 2013

Farm to Market Road 2013 (FM 2013) is located in Parmer County. Most of the highway's route passes through rural ranch land in the western Panhandle region.

FM 2013 begins at the New Mexico state line near Rhea. The highway travels in an eastern direction and turns south at County Road B and turns back east at County Road 5. FM 2013 continues to run in an eastern direction with the route becoming slightly less rural after an intersection with FM 1731. The highway then briefly enters the town of Friona before ending at an intersection with US 60/SH 214.

The highway was extended  to the New Mexico state line on May 2, 1962. FM 2013 was extended to US 60/SH 214 in Friona on September 18, 1996, absorbing part of FM 1731 in the process.

Junction list

FM 2013 (1952)

On June 30, 1955, FM 2013 (along with the section of FM 2011 from FM 782 at Oak Hill to SH 322) was removed from the state highway system in exchange for the creation of FM 1716, connecting FM 782 at Oak Hill to a county road at Chalk Hill.

FM 2014

FM 2015

FM 2016

FM 2017

Farm to Market Road 2017 (FM 2017) is a  route connecting FM 1523 in Culberson County and US 90 between Van Horn and Valentine in Jeff Davis County.

FM 2017 follows a road with narrow lanes and grassy shoulders. The route lies within a broad, flat valley between the Sierra Vieja range to the west and the Davis Mountains to the east. The road enters Jeff Davis County and continues southward  until it reaches a junction with Chispa Road. At this point the road turns northeast for the remainder of the distance to US 90.

FM 2017 travels primarily through farm and ranch along its length. The road does not pass through any cities or towns, Between its ending points, the only major local road FM 2017 intersects is Chispa Road, a primitive county road that goes to the Rio Grande and follows the river to the northwest terminus of FM 170 at Candelaria in Presidio County. The western terminus of FM 2017 at US 90 is near the Chispa Switch at the location of the former town of Chispa on the Union Pacific Railroad which runs alongside US 90.

FM 2017 was designated on September 27, 1960, along its current route.

FM 2017 (1952)

On October 31, 1957, the road was extended east  into Ochiltree County. FM 2017 was cancelled on February 16, 1960, and transferred to FM 281 when it was extended.

FM 2018

Farm to Market Road 2018 (FM 2018) is located in Hansford County. It begins at FM 1573 southwest of Gruver and runs east, intersecting SH 136, before ending at SH 15 west of Spearman.

On October 31, 1958, it was extended west to FM 1573. On June 1, 1965, FM 2018 was extended to its current eastern terminus.

FM 2019

Farm to Market Road 2019 (FM 2019) is located in western Ector County.

FM 2019 was designated on December 17, 1952, from SH 302, 1 mile east of Notrees, south and east 10.2 miles to SH 302. On May 25, 1954, FM 2019 was shortened by 7.2 miles to a 3-mile route south from SH 302. FM 2019 was extended south 5.3 miles on June 28, 1963, and another 4.2 miles south on June 1, 1965, but these extensions were cancelled on July 31, 1975, due to difficulties in acquiring right-of-way.

FM 2020

Farm to Market Road 2020 (FM 2020) is located in Ector County. It is locally known as University Boulevard.

FM 2020 begins at an intersection with FM 866 in West Odessa and runs through the town in a slight northeast direction. The highway intersects FM 1936 near the east edge of town. At the junction with SH 302/Loop 338, FM 2020 enters the Odessa city limits. It intersects FM 1882 before ending at Spur 450.

FM 2020 was designated on December 17, 1952, running from FM 866 eastward  to FM 1936. The highway was extended  on June 1, 1965, to the then-western city limits of Odessa. On June 27, 1995, the entire route was redesignated Urban Road 2020 (UR 2020). The designation reverted to FM 2020 with the elimination of the Urban Road system on November 15, 2018.

Junction list

FM 2021

FM 2022

RM 2023

It provides access to a natural gas field from I-10 between Fort Stockton and Bakersfield.

RM 2023 begins in the Puckett Gas Field at the north end of Puckett Road, a county road that approaches from the southeast from US 285. After a short distance, RM 2023 intersects Harrel Road, which connects to RM 2886.

RM 2023 was designated on November 24, 1959, along its current route. The route previously ended at US 290, the predecessor to I-10 through much of western Texas.

FM 2023

A previous route, Farm to Market Road 2023 (FM 2023), was designated in Nacogdoches County on December 17, 1952, from US 59 in Garrison southeast  to a road intersection. On November 28, 1958, FM 2023 was cancelled and transferred to FM 138.

FM 2024

FM 2025

Farm to Market Road 2025 (FM 2025) is located in San Jacinto and Liberty counties. It runs from SH 150 south of Coldspring to US 59 in Cleveland.

FM 2025 was designated on December 17, 1952, from FM 945 south  to US 59 in Cleveland (a portion of the route was initially planned as FM 1412 in 1949). On November 21, 1956, the road was extended north . On December 17, 1956, the road was extended  to SH 150 some 2 miles south of Coldspring, replacing FM 1828.

FM 2026

FM 2027

FM 2027 (1952)

The original FM 2027 was designated on December 17, 1952, from US 377, 5 miles south of Brownwood, southwest  to a road intersection. On November 21, 1956, the road was extended southwest  to FM 586. FM 2027 was cancelled on April 22, 1958, and transferred to FM 1176.

FM 2028

FM 2029

FM 2029 (1952)

The first use of the FM 2029 designation was in Dimmit County, from the Zavala County line south  via Big Wells. FM 2029 was cancelled a year later and transferred to FM 1867.

FM 2029 (1953)

The next use of the FM 2029 designation was in Dallam and Hartley counties, from FM 281 north  to FM 297 east of Dalhart. FM 2029 was cancelled on December 18, 1959, and transferred to FM 807.

FM 2030

FM 2031

Farm to Market Road 2031 (FM 2031) is located in Matagorda County.

FM 2031 begins at the Gulf of Mexico, at the entrance to Matagorda County Jetty Park on Matagorda Peninsula. The route heads north along the strip of land which separates Matagorda Bay and East Matagorda Bay, and parallels the Colorado River to its west. The highway enters Matagorda before ending at  SH 60.

FM 2031 was designated on December 17, 1952, replacing SH 344.

FM 2032
Farm to Market Road 2032 (FM 2032) is a designation that has been used twice. No highway currently uses the FM 2032 designation.

FM 2032 (1952)

FM 817 became part of FM 669 on October 30, 1953. The highway was extended  to Vincent on July 28, 1955. FM 2032 was cancelled on December 31, 1959, with the mileage being transferred to FM 846.

FM 2032 (1960)

The highway was cancelled on August 19, 1964, with the mileage being transferred to FM 1570.

FM 2033

RM 2034

Ranch to Market Road 2034 (RM 2034) is located in Coke and Tom Green counties.

RM 2034 begins near the Tom Green–Coke county line. The highway travels through highly rural areas and passes by many ranches. RM 2034 has a junction with US 87 near Water Valley, before running through more rural areas. The highway has a short overlap with SH 158 near the south shore of the E.V. Spence Reservoir. After leaving its overlap with SH 158, RM 2034 runs in a mostly eastern direction before ending at an intersection with SH 208 just south of Robert Lee.

RM 2034 was designated October 28, 1953, as Farm to Market Road 2034 (FM 2034) from SH 208 westward and southwestward . On October 26, 1954, FM 2034 was extended southwest . On August 24, 1955, FM 2034 was extended southwest . On October 1, 1956, FM 2034 was redesignated as RM 2034. On November 21, 1956, RM 2034 was extended southwest  to US 87 & FM 2186. On January 21, 1969, a 2.5 mile section was cancelled due to construction of E.V. Spence Reservoir.

FM 2034 (1952)

FM 2034 was previously designated on December 17, 1952, from US 183 east  to Lower Meyersville. FM 2034 was cancelled on October 28, 1953, and transferred to FM 237.

Junction list

FM 2035

FM 2035 (1952)

The first use of the FM 2035 designation was in Kerr County, from SH 41 near Mountain Home south  to FM 1340. FM 2035 was cancelled on December 19, 1958, and removed from the highway system.

FM 2035 (1961)

The next use of the FM 2035 was in Johnson County, from SH 174, 2.6 miles southwest of US 81, south  to FM 917. FM 2035 was cancelled on May 21, 1964, and transferred to FM 731.

FM 2036

FM 2036 (1952)

The original FM 2036 was designated on December 17, 1952, from SH OSR, 4 miles north of Midway, north  to a road intersection. FM 2036 was cancelled on May 25, 1962, and transferred to FM 1119.

FM 2037

Farm to Market Road 2037 (FM 2037) is located in Pecos County. The road begins at the Lynaugh prison unit and proceeds to the east  to Old Alpine Road. FM 2037 then follows Old Alpine Road  to the northeast parallel with the South Orient Railroad passing through Belding. The road then turns north passing through orchards and cropland to I-10.

On May 2, 1962, the current route was designated over a  stretch from the Old Alpine Rd. to  US 290, the route that preceded I-10. The route was extended to the prison site on October 29, 1992.

The Old Alpine Rd. portion of the route has a much longer history with the state highway network. US 67 designation was extended westward from Dallas to Presidio in 1932. The portion of US 67 between Alpine and Fort Stockton was constructed as an unpaved earth road sometime between 1933 and 1936 and was also designated as State Highway 99 (SH 99) (later State Highway 10 (SH 99). The SH 10 designation did not survive the 1939 redescription of the state highway system, and US 67 was realigned off of the Old Alpine Rd. when its more westward current roadway was constructed in 1947.

Junction list

FM 2037 (1952)

FM 2037 was originally designated on December 17, 1952 as a  route in northeastern Brazos County beginning along the concurrent routes of  US 190 / SH 21 near the Navasota River proceeding to the northwest to the town of Edge. On November 21, 1956, that route was extended an additional  to the southwest to  FM 2038. The Brazos County designation was canceled on October 13, 1961 when the route was added as an extension to FM 974.

FM 2038

The road continues from another point on Business SH 21-H in Kurten southeastward to Cobb Rd near Reliance.

FM 2038 was designated on December 17, 1952, from SH 21 in Kurten northwest  to a county road. This road would later become part of FM 2037, and later, FM 974. On August 24, 1955, FM 2038 was extended southeast .

Junction list

FM 2039

FM 2040

Farm to Market Road 2040 (FM 2040) is located in Refugio and Aransas counties. It runs from FM 774 to the Aransas National Wildlife Refuge.

FM 2040 was designated on December 17, 1952, on the current route. A  extension to SH 239 was proposed on November 25, 1975, but was cancelled on August 31, 1977, due to heavy local opposition.

FM 2041

Farm to Market Road 2041 (FM 2041) is located in Chambers County. It runs from FM 563 north of Anahuac to SH 61.

FM 2041 was designated on December 17, 1952, on the current route.

FM 2042

FM 2043

FM 2044

FM 2045

FM 2046

FM 2046 (1952)

The original FM 2046 was designated on December 17, 1952, from US 83 at Bradshaw west  to a road intersection. FM 2046 was cancelled on January 21, 1955, and became a portion of FM 1086.

FM 2047

FM 2047 (1952)

The original FM 2047 was designated on December 17, 1952, from FM 197 northwest  to Garretts Bluff. FM 2047 was cancelled on May 5, 1962, and transferred to FM 1499.

FM 2048

FM 2048 (1953)

The original FM 2048 was designated on January 22, 1953, from FM 45, 5.5 miles north of Richland Springs, northwest  to a road intersection at Holt. Nine months later the road was extended northwest  to the McCulloch County line. FM 2048 was cancelled on September 23, 1954, and became a portion of FM 502.

FM 2049

FM 2050

Farm to Market 2050 (FM 2050) is a road that connects SH 359 at Bruni to US 59 (future I-69W).

FM 2050 was designated on December 17, 1952, along its current route.

FM 2051

FM 2052

FM 2053

FM 2054

FM 2054 (1952)

The original FM 2054 was designated on December 17, 1952, from SH 137, 4.3 miles southeast of Welch, west  to a road intersection. FM 2054 was cancelled on June 19, 1967, and transferred to FM 1066.

FM 2055

Farm to Market Road 2055 (FM 2055) is located in Gaines and Yoakum counties. It runs from FM 1757 to SH 83 in Denver City.

FM 2055 was designated on December 17, 1952, from FM 1757 north, east and north to the Yoakum County Line. On April 25, 1960, the section from SH 83 to SH 214 was removed from the state highway system and returned to Denver City.

FM 2056

FM 2057

FM 2058

RM 2059

FM 2059

On October 31, 1957, the road was extended east to US 281. On January 20, 1958, FM 2059 was cancelled and transferred to FM 490.

FM 2060

FM 2060 (1952)

The original FM 2060 was designated on December 17, 1952, from US 83 west of Weslaco south  to FM 88. FM 2060 was cancelled on May 6, 1954, and became a portion of FM 1015.

FM 2061

Farm to Market Road 2061 (FM 2061) is located in Hidalgo County in the Rio Grande Valley.

FM 2061 begins at an intersection with US 281 Spur in southern Pharr. The highway runs along Jackson Road through more suburban areas and runs through a commercialized area near I-2/US 83. Just north of I-2/US 83, FM 2061 begins an overlap with Bus. US 83 then enters McAllen. The highway leaves its overlap with Bus. US 83 at McColl Road and passes through a suburban area of the city. FM 2061 crosses into Edinburg at Dove Avenue and runs near the western edge of the city before ending at an intersection with FM 1925.

FM 2061 was designated on December 17, 1952, running from SH 107 southward to US 83. The highway was extended southward from US 83 to US 281 on October 31, 1957. FM 2061 was extended northward from US 83 to FM 1925 on June 1, 1965. On June 27, 1995, the entire route was redesignated Urban Road 2061 (UR 2061). The designation reverted to FM 2061 with the elimination of the Urban Road system on November 15, 2018.

Junction list

FM 2062

Farm to Market Road 2062 (FM 2062) is located in Hidalgo County in the Rio Grande Valley.

FM 2062 begins at Park Road 43 at the main entrance to Bentsen-Rio Grande Valley State Park. The highway runs through less developed areas of southwestern Mission before entering Palmview South. FM 2062 then enters Palmview, where it ends at an intersection with Bus. US 83. The highway is known locally as Bentsen Palm Drive.

FM 2062 was designated on December 17, 1952, running from US 83 (now Bus. US 83) southward to Bentsen-Rio Grande Valley State Park. The highway was extended eastward from the state park to FM 1016 in the Madero area of Mission on June 28, 1963. This extension was removed from the state highway system on November 26, 1969, as it was never constructed. On June 27, 1995, the entire route was redesignated Urban Road 2062 (UR 2062). The designation reverted to FM 2062 with the elimination of the Urban Road system on November 15, 2018.

FM 2063

Farm to Market Road 2063 (FM 2063) is located in McLennan County in the city of Hewitt.

FM 2063 begins at a junction with I-35/FM 2113. The highway runs along Sun Valley Road and intersects FM 3476 before ending at an intersection with FM 1695 near the town square. FM 2063 is known locally as Sun Valley Boulevard.

The current FM 2063 was designated on November 24, 1959, running from FM 1695 eastward to I-35. On June 27, 1995, the entire route was redesignated Urban Road 2063 (UR 2063). The designation reverted to FM 2063 with the elimination of the Urban Road system on November 15, 2018.

Junction list

FM 2063 (1952)

The first FM 2063 was designated on December 17, 1952, from US 281 at Antelope north to the Clay County line. FM 2063 was cancelled on October 18, 1954, and became a portion of FM 175.

FM 2063 (1955)

FM 2063 was designated a second time on October 25, 1955, from FM 594 at Cotton Center east  to US 87. FM 2063 was cancelled on November 26, 1958, and transferred to FM 1315 (now FM 37).

FM 2064

Farm to Market Road 2064 (FM 2064) is located in Cherokee County. It runs from SH 135 (former FM 347) south of Troup via Gould to SH 135 at Tecula.

FM 2064 was designated on December 17, 1952 on the current route. On July 28, 2005 a 1.98 mile section of FM 2064 from south of FM 2750 to east of CR 4223 was removed from the highway system (planned to be inundated by Lake Columbia) and a 2.1 mile section from east of CR 4223 to SH 135 was redesignated as FM 3540, but the lake was never constructed.

FM 2065

FM 2066

FM 2067

FM 2067 (1952)

The original FM 2067 was designated on December 17, 1952, from US 281, 1.2 miles east of Progresso, south  to the Rio Grande. FM 2067 was cancelled on September 22, 1953, and transferred to FM 88 (now FM 1015).

FM 2068

Farm to Market Road 2068 (FM 2068) is located in Hunt and Delta counties. It runs from SH 50 at Jardin to FM 1528 at Gough. There is a concurrency with FM 904.

FM 2068 was designated on December 17, 1952, from SH 11 (now SH 50) at Jardin east to FM 904. On October 15, 1954, the road was extended east  to FM 1528 at Gough, replacing FM 2127 and creating a concurrency with FM 904.

FM 2069

FM 2070

Farm to Market Road 2070 (FM 2070) is located in Baylor County. It runs from US 277 southwest of Seymour to the Knox County line.

FM 2070 was designated on December 17, 1952, from US 277, 5.5 miles southwest of Seymour, west  to a road intersection. On August 24, 1955, the road was extended west and south  to US 277 at Bomarton. This extension was cancelled on December 4, 1957, in exchange for FM 2070 being extended west  to the Knox County line.

FM 2071

FM 2072

FM 2073

FM 2074

FM 2075

FM 2076

FM 2076 (1952)

The original FM 2076 was designated on December 17, 1952, from FM 209 east of the Throckmorton County line south  to the Stephens County line. FM 2076 was cancelled on October 28, 1953, and transferred to FM 578.

FM 2077

FM 2077 (1952)

The original FM 2077 was designated on December 17, 1952, from SH 213, 7 miles northwest of Higgins, north  to the south bank of Wolf Creek. FM 2077 was cancelled on November 29, 1957, and transferred to FM 1454.

FM 2078

Farm to Market Road 2078 (FM 2078) is located in Matagorda County. It runs from SH 60 in Wadsworth to FM 2668.

FM 2078 was designated on September 21, 1955, as a replacement of a section of FM 521 when it was rerouted southwest.

FM 2078 (1952)

The original FM 2078 was designated on December 17, 1952, from FM 145, 6 miles east of Kress, south, west, and south to FM 788. FM 2078 was cancelled on February 24, 1953, and became a portion of FM 400.

FM 2079

FM 2080

FM 2081

FM 2081 (1952)

FM 2081 was cancelled on August 24, 1955, and transferred to FM 1416 (now partly FM 2460).

FM 2081 (1955)

The second use of the FM 2081 designation was in Lynn County, from US 380, 1.5 miles east of the Terry County line, north  to a road intersection. On November 21, 1956, the road was extended south  to FM 213. FM 2081 was cancelled on January 8, 1960, and transferred to FM 179.

FM 2081 (1960)

The third use of the FM 2081 designation was in Kaufman County, from I-20 east of Forney northeast  to the Rockwall County line. On May 2, 1962, the road was extended northeast  to SH 205. FM 2081 was cancelled on May 25, 1962, and transferred to FM 548.

FM 2082

FM 2082 (1952)

The original FM 2082 was designated on December 17, 1952, from FM 651 east  to Kalgary as a renumbering of a section of FM 651. FM 2082 was cancelled on July 19, 1954, and transferred to FM 261.

RM 2083

 This was originally FM 2083.

RM 2084

Ranch to Market Road 2084 (RM 2084) is located in Tom Green and Schleicher counties. It runs from US 277 at Christoval to US 190.

On May 26, 1954, the road was extended southeast  (this extension cancelled FM 2085). On November 13, 1959, FM 2084 was changed to RM 2084. On September 20, 1961, the road was extended south . On October 9, 1961, the road was extended south  to SH 29 (now US 190), replacing RM 2479.

FM 2085

FM 2085 (1952)

FM 2085 was designated on December 17, 1952, from US 67 at Tankersley south  to Knickerbocker. FM 2085 was cancelled on May 26, 1954, in exchange for extending FM 2084 southeast the same distance from its previous end.

FM 2086

FM 2087

Farm to Market Road 2087 (FM 2087) runs from FM 349 in Kilgore north to Loop 281 (originally this section was FM 1919; this section was later part of FM 1845) in Longview.

FM 2087 was designated on December 17, 1952, along its current route. On June 27, 1995, the section from I-20 to Loop 281 was redesignated Urban Road 2087 (UR 2087). The designation of this section reverted to FM 2087 with the elimination of the Urban Road system on November 15, 2018.

FM 2088

FM 2089

FM 2089 (1952)

The original FM 2089 was designated on December 17, 1952, from FM 17, 3 miles west of Yantis, west  to the Rains County line. FM 2089 was cancelled ten months later and transferred to FM 1767 (now FM 514).

FM 2090

FM 2091

FM 2092

FM 2092 (1952)

The original FM 2092 was designated on December 17, 1952, from FM 1160 north  to a county road. FM 2092 was cancelled on October 5, 1953, and transferred to FM 1160.

FM 2093

Farm to Market Road 2093 (FM 2093) is located in Gillespie County in the Texas Hill Country.

FM 2093 begins at an intersection with US 290/RM 783 in Harper. The highway travels in a mostly eastern direction, passes through Tivydale, before entering Fredericksburg where the road ends at an intersection with SH 16. The roadway continues past SH 16 as Friendship Lane. FM 2093 is known locally in Fredericksburg as Tivydale Road.

The highway was extended northwestward to US 290 on November 21, 1956.

FM 2094

Farm to Market Road 2094 (FM 2094) is located in Galveston County.

FM 2094 begins at an intersection with FM 518 near FM 270 in League City. The highway travels in a northeast direction and turns in a more eastern direction at South Shore Boulevard. FM 2094 enters Kemah right before ending at an intersection with SH 146/future SH 99 near the Kemah Boardwalk. The highway is locally known as Marina Bay Drive.

The current FM 2094 was designated on January 16, 1968, along the current route. On June 27, 1995, the entire route was redesignated Urban Road 2094 (UR 2094). The designation reverted to FM 2094 with the elimination of the Urban Road system on November 15, 2018.

FM 2094 (1952)

The first use of the FM 2094 designation was in San Patricio County, from FM 632 (now SH 361) in Ingleside south, east and south  to Redfish Bay. FM 2094 was cancelled on November 20, 1953, and transferred to FM 1069.

FM 2094 (1953)

The second use of the FM 2094 designation was in Montague County, from US 81 in Bowie south  to Rock Hill School. On August 24, 1955, the road was extended south and west  to a county road. On May 2, 1962, the road was extended southwest  to the Jack County line. FM 2094 was cancelled on July 25, 1963, and transferred to FM 1125.

FM 2094 (1964)

On June 1, 1965, the road was extended west  to a road intersection. FM 2094 was cancelled on June 21, 1967, and became a portion of FM 2073.

FM 2095

FM 2096

FM 2097

FM 2097 (1952)

The original FM 2097 was designated on December 17, 1952, from US 190 (now FM 485) near Goodland southeast  to US 79 (now US 79/US 190) near Valley Junction. FM 2097 was cancelled on October 15, 1954, and became a portion of FM 1644.

FM 2098

FM 2099

Notes

References

+20
Farm to market roads 2000
Farm to Market Roads 2000